John Craig "Sky" Hertwig (January 15, 1952 – May 30, 2012) was an American football offensive tackle who played three seasons with the Detroit Lions of the National Football League (NFL). He was drafted by the Lions in the fourth round of the 1975 NFL Draft. He played college football at the University of Georgia and attended Mark Smith High School in Macon, Georgia. Hertwig was also a member of the Buffalo Bills. He died of heart failure on May 30, 2012 in Athens, Georgia. He owned a bar for 32 years in Athens up to his death. Hertwig was nicknamed "Sky" in reference to his height.

References

External links
Just Sports Stats

1952 births
2012 deaths
Players of American football from Columbus, Georgia
American football offensive tackles
Georgia Bulldogs football players
Detroit Lions players
Buffalo Bills players
Sportspeople from Athens, Georgia